The Georgetown Hoyas baseball team represents Georgetown University in the Big East Conference, part of the NCAA's Division I level of college baseball.  Baseball is Georgetown's second oldest sport after cricket, with the first recorded game taking place in 1866, and the team formally organized and sanctioned in 1870. The team was once known as the Stonewalls, and is one possible source of the Hoya Saxa cheer famous among all Georgetown sports teams. Georgetown has yet to make an appearance in the NCAA Division I baseball tournament.

Facilities

The Hoyas play their home games at Shirley Povich Field, a 1,500 seat stadium located in Bethesda, Maryland and named for Washington Post sports columnist Shirley Povich.  The stadium was built in 1998.  The Hoyas also utilize three lighted batting cages and two bullpen areas located on campus above Yates Field House, and adjacent to Kehoe Field. In the fall of 2017, the Hoyas added an indoor hitting and pitching facility which is located on campus under the Leavey Center.

See also

List of NCAA Division I baseball programs

References